Flavius Iordanes was a Roman general and politician. He was holding the office of magister militum per Orientem when the Western Emperor Anthemius appointed him consul with Messius Phoebus Severus for 470.

References
 

5th-century Romans
5th-century Roman consuls
Byzantine generals
Imperial Roman consuls
Magistri militum
Year of birth unknown
Year of death unknown